John Dennis may refer to:

John Dennis (1771–1806), Maryland congressman
John Dennis (1807–1859), his son, Maryland congressman
John Dennis (bishop) (1931–2020), former Bishop of St Edmundsbury and Ipswich
John Dennis (carmaker) (1871–1939), English carmaker, in Dennis Brothers (which became Dennis Specialist Vehicles)
John Dennis (diplomat) (born 1959), British diplomat, U.K. Ambassador to Taiwan, and former U.K. Ambassador to Angol
John Dennis (dramatist) (1658–1734), English dramatist
John Dennis (Missouri politician) (1917–2000), Missouri politician
John Dennis (ornithologist) (c. 1916 – 2002), American ornithologist
John Dennis (talk show host) (born c. 1952), American radio talk show host
John B. Dennis (1835–1894), American Union Civil War era brevet brigadier general
John E. Dennis (born 1939), mathematician
John N. Dennis (born 1933), American politician in the New Jersey General Assembly
John Stoughton Dennis (1820–1885), Canadian surveyor
John William Dennis, Member of Parliament for Birmingham Deritend, 1918–1922a

Companies
Dennis Specialist Vehicles or John Dennis Coachbuilders, a British coachbuilder and manufacturer of specialised vehicles

See also

Jack Dennis (born 1931), American electrical engineer and computer scientist
Jack Dennis (cricketer) (1913–2006), English cricketer
Jackie Dennis (1942–2020), singer
John Dennys (died 1609), poet and fisherman

Dennis, John